Camillus Adriani was a Roman Catholic prelate who served as Auxiliary Bishop of Ostia-Velletri (1639–?) and Titular Bishop of Halmiros (1639–?).

Biography
On 16 May 1639, Camillus Adriani was appointed during the papacy of Pope Urban VIII as Auxiliary Bishop of Ostia-Velletri and Titular Bishop of Halmiros.
On 22 May 1639, he was consecrated bishop by Alessandro Cesarini (iuniore), Cardinal-Deacon of Sant'Eustachio, with Lelio Falconieri, Titular Archbishop of Thebae, and Giovanni Battista Altieri, Bishop Emeritus of Camerino, serving as co-consecrators.
it is uncertain how long he served; the next Titular Bishop of Halmiros was Sebastian Denich who was appointed in 1650.

References 

17th-century Italian Roman Catholic bishops
Bishops appointed by Pope Urban VIII